Thao Lam is a Vietnamese-Canadian children's author and illustrator. She lives in Toronto, Ontario.

Her works are completed in a collage style.

Biography 
Lam came to Canada with her parents at the age of 3, as a refugee from Vietnam. She credits picture books for helping her settle into life in Canada, particularly the works of children's author Robert Munsch and Dr. Seuss.

Lam studied illustration at Toronto's Sheridan College.

Works

Awards and nominations 
 Toronto Public Library's "First and Best 2016" list selection (Skunk on a String)  
 Kirkus Reviews Best Children's Books of 2018 (Wallpaper)
 New York Public Library's Best Books for Kids 2018 Picks (Wallpaper)
 Selected to Represent Canada in IBBY's Silent Books Collection, 2019 (Wallpaper)
 Winner of School Library Journal's the Most Astonishingly Unconventional Children's Books of 2019 (My Cat Looks Like My Dad)

References 

Living people
Artists from Toronto
Writers from Toronto
Vietnamese emigrants to Canada
21st-century Canadian writers
Canadian children's writers
Vietnamese women children's writers
Canadian women children's writers
21st-century Canadian women writers
Canadian women illustrators
Vietnamese women illustrators
Canadian children's book illustrators
Vietnamese children's book illustrators
Year of birth missing (living people)